Clarence L. Kooistra (born January 25, 1941) is an American former politician. He served in the South Dakota House of Representatives from 1997 to 2002 and in the Senate from 2003 to 2006.

After losing renomination in 2006, Kooistra joined the South Dakota Democratic Party.

References

1941 births
Living people
People from Miner County, South Dakota
Educators from South Dakota
South Dakota Republicans
South Dakota Democrats
Members of the South Dakota House of Representatives
South Dakota state senators